John Lement Bacon (June 18, 1862 – April 27, 1909) was a Vermont banker, businessman and politician who served as State Treasurer.

Early life
John L. Bacon was born in Chelsea, Vermont on June 18, 1862.  He attended school in Chelsea, and graduated from St. Johnsbury Academy.  In 1881 he began a career in banking at the First National Bank of Chelsea of which his father was President, and he became Cashier in 1883.

Early career
A Republican, Bacon served as Orange County Treasurer from 1884 to 1885.

When the National Bank of White River Junction was organized in 1886, Bacon relocated to Hartford and was appointed Cashier (while Maxwell Evarts was President), and held this position until his death.

From 1891 to 1898 Bacon served as Hartford's Town Treasurer.  From 1892 to 1893 he served in the Vermont House of Representatives.

He was also involved in several businesses, including the Ottaquechee Woolen Company and the Fairground Railroad Company.

State Treasurer
Bacon was elected state treasurer in 1898, and served until 1906.

At the time, Vermont's treasurer and secretary of state also served as Vermont's insurance commissioners, and Bacon was elected secretary, vice president and president of the National Convention of Insurance Commissioners.

Later career
After serving as state treasurer, Bacon continued his banking and business career.  In 1908 he returned to the Vermont House and was appointed chairman of the Appropriations Committee.

Death and burial
Bacon died in Hartford on April 27, 1909.  He was interred in a family vault at Hartford Point Cemetery.

Home
In Hartford Bacon purchased the house and farm that had once been owned by Lieutenant Governor Joseph Marsh, and christened the property "Marshland." The home still stands and is today operated as the Quechee Inn at Marshland Farm.

References

1862 births
1909 deaths
People from Chelsea, Vermont
People from Hartford, Vermont
St. Johnsbury Academy alumni
Republican Party members of the Vermont House of Representatives
State treasurers of Vermont
American bankers
19th-century American railroad executives
Burials in Vermont
19th-century American politicians